Nemeris sternitzkyi is a species of geometrid moth in the family Geometridae. It is found in North America.

The MONA or Hodges number for Nemeris sternitzkyi is 6876.2. It was named, by Frederick H. Rindge in honour of the entomologist, Robert F. Sternitzky.

References

Further reading

 

Ourapterygini
Articles created by Qbugbot
Moths described in 1981